Norton Heath is a hamlet in the High Ongar civil parish, and the Epping Forest District of Essex, England. The settlement is at the northeast of the parish and on the north side of the Harlow to Chelmsford A414 road.

References 
A-Z Essex (page 69)

External links

Hamlets in Essex
Epping Forest District